Constantine I or Kostandin I (1035–1040 – c. 1100) was the second lord of Armenian Cilicia or “Lord of the Mountains” (1095 – c. 1100). He ruled the greater part of the Taurus Mountain regions, while managing the towns and lands within his domain. He provided ample provisions to the Crusaders, for example during the difficult period of the siege of Antioch in the winter of 1097. He was a passionate adherent of the separated Armenian Church.

Early years 
He was the son of Roupen I; his father declared the independence of Cilicia from the Byzantine Empire around 1080. According to the chroniclers Matthew of Edessa and Sempat Sparapet, Constantine is also identified as being either a prince of King Gagik II, or some kind of a military commander in the monarch’s clan in exile. 

Upon the murder of King Gagik II, Constantine’s father gathered his family and fled to the Taurus Mountains and took refuge in the fortress of Kopitar (Kosidar) situated north of Sis (today Kozan in Turkey). By 1090, Roupen was not capable of leading his troops, therefore his son Constantine inherited his command and  conquered the castle of Vahka. The mastery of this mountain defile made possible the assessment of taxes on merchandise transported from the port of Ayas towards the central part of Asia Minor, a source of wealth to which the Roupenians owed their power.

His rule 
After his father’s death in 1095, Constantine extended his power eastward towards the Anti-Taurus Mountains. As an Armenian Christian ruler in the Levant, he helped the forces of the First Crusade maintain the siege of Antioch until it fell to the crusaders. The crusaders, for their part, duly appreciated the aid of their Armenian allies: Constantin was honored with gifts, the title of "marquis", and a knighthood.

The Chronographie of Samuel of Ani records that Constantine died soon after a lightning bolt struck his table in the fortress of Vahka. He was buried in Castalon.

Marriage and children 
According to the Chronicle of Aleppo, his wife was descended from Bardas Phokas.

 (? – before 1118), the wife of Count Joscelin I of Edessa
Thoros I, Lord of Armenian Cilicia (? – February 17, 1129 / February 16, 1130)
Leo I, Lord of Armenian Cilicia (? – Constantinople, February 14, 1140)

References

Sources

External links 
The Barony of Cilician Armenia (Kurkjian's History of Armenia, Ch. 27)

1102 deaths
11th-century births
Deaths from lightning strikes
11th-century Armenian people
Monarchs of the Rubenid dynasty